Tangzhen is a station on Line 2 of the Shanghai Metro, It is located in and named after the town of Tang (zh), in the Pudong New Area.

References

Shanghai Metro stations in Pudong
Railway stations in China opened in 2010
Line 2, Shanghai Metro
Railway stations in Shanghai